Victoria "Vicky" Travascio (born 14 July 1988) is an Argentine sailor. She and María Sol Branz won a gold medal in the women's 49erFX event at the 2015 Pan American Games, and bronze in the 2019 edition.

The two also competed in two Olympic Games, finishing 13th in the 49erFX event at the 2016 Summer Olympics, and fifth in the 2020 Summer Olympics.

References

External links
 

1988 births
Living people
Argentine female sailors (sport)
Olympic sailors of Argentina
Sailors at the 2016 Summer Olympics – 49er FX
Sailors at the 2015 Pan American Games
Pan American Games gold medalists for Argentina
Pan American Games medalists in sailing
Sailors at the 2019 Pan American Games
Medalists at the 2015 Pan American Games
Medalists at the 2019 Pan American Games
Sailors at the 2020 Summer Olympics – 49er FX
Sportspeople from La Plata